Donald Washington may refer to:

 Donald Washington (American football) (born 1986), American football defensive back
 Donald Washington Sr. (1930–2009), American jazz tenor saxophonist
 Donald Washington (basketball) (born 1952), American basketball player
 Donald W. Washington (born 1955), American lawyer

See also
 Donald, Washington, an unincorporated community in Yakima County, Washington, United States